David Wilson is a United States Army major general who serves as the Commanding General of the United States Army Sustainment Command since July 19, 2022. He most recently served as the Commanding General of 8th Theater Sustainment Command at Fort Shafter, Hawaii from June 16, 2020, to June 14, 2022. He previously served as the Director J/U-4, United States Forces Korea/United Nations Command/Deputy Director, C4 Combined Forces Command located in Camp Humphreys, Republic of Korea and as the 40th Chief of Ordnance and Commandant of the United States Army Ordnance School at Fort Lee, Virginia.

Education
Wilson is a native of Charleston, South Carolina. He received his commission and a Bachelor of Science degree in Business Administration from The Citadel, the Military College of South Carolina. He holds a Master of Science in General Administration from Central Michigan University, Mount Pleasant, Michigan and a Master of Science in National Resource Strategy from the Industrial College of the Armed forces. His military education includes the Field Artillery Officer Basic Course, the Ordnance Officer Transition Course, the Combined Logistics Officer Advanced Course, the Combined Arms and Services Staff School, the Command and General Staff Officer Course, and the Industrial College of the Armed Forces.

Military career
Upon completion of the Field Artillery Officer Basic Course, Wilson was assigned as a Fire Support Officer for the 1st Battalion, 5th Infantry at Camp Hovey, Korea; Platoon Leader, 503rd Maintenance Company, 530th Supply & Services Battalion; Company Executive Officer, 364th Supply and Services Company, 264th Corps Support Battalion with deployment to Mogadishu, Somalia; Platoon Leader and Shop Officer, 503rd Maintenance Company, 264th Corps Support Battalion; and Support Operations Maintenance Officer, 264th Corps Support Battalion, with deployment to Haiti.

In 1996, Wilson was assigned as the Assistant Brigade S4, 2d Brigade, 3rd Infantry Division (Mechanized), Fort Stewart Georgia. He assumed command of Delta Company, 703d Main Support Battalion in 1997 after serving as the 3d Division Material Management Center, 1st Brigade Material Manager, where he deployed in support of Operations Desert Thunder. He then served in the Headquarters, United States Army Training and Doctrine Command at Fort Monroe, Virginia, in the Joint Venture Directorate as Experimental CSS Integration Officer for the Army Light Experimentation Axis and then as Executive Officer to the Deputy Chief of Staff for Combat Developments.

Following completion of the Command and General Staff Officer Course in 2003, Wilson was assigned as the Executive Officer for the 1st Armored Division, Division Support Command, Germany with deployment to Iraq in support of Operation Iraqi Freedom and Operation Iron Saber. Additional assignments include Battalion Executive Officer, 501st Forward Support Battalion (2004); Assistant Chief of Staff, Deputy G4, 1st Armored Division Headquarters (2005); and Logistics Majors Assignment Officer, U.S. Army Human Resources Command (2006).

In 2008, Wilson assumed command of the 121st Brigade Support Battalion, 1st Armored Division, Fort Bliss, Texas. Following a deployment in support of Operation Iraqi Freedom, Wilson reported to the Office of the Chief of Staff of the Army where he served as the Logistics Colonels Assignment Officer. In 2011, Wilson attended the Industrial College of the Armed Forces and then reported to Fort Bragg, North Carolina, to assume command of the 406th Army Field Support Brigade. Following brigade command in 2014, he was assigned to United States Army Materiel Command (AMC) as the Executive Officer to the AMC Commanding General. On August 10, 2016, Wilson became the 40th Chief of Ordnance and assumed command of the United States Army Ordnance School.

Before assuming command of the U.S. Army Sustainment Command, Wilson served as the 8th Commanding General of the 8th Theater Sustainment Command United States Army Pacific, Fort Shaftner, Hawaii.

Wilson has participated in numerous military operations; to include, Operation Restore/Continue Hope in Somalia, Operation Uphold Democracy in Haiti, Operation Desert Thunder/Desert Fox in Kuwait, and multiple deployments to Iraq for the Iraq War.

Awards and decorations

Other honors
Wilson is a Distinguished Military Graduate of The Citadel, The Military College of South Carolina. He holds an honorary doctorate of Military Science from The Citadel, The Military College of South Carolina. He has been awarded the General Brehon V. Somervell Medal and has been recognized as a Demonstrated Master Logistician by the International Society of Logistics. Wilson is a member of the Ordnance Order of Samuel Sharpe and the Field Artillery Order of Saint Barbara.

References

Year of birth missing (living people)
Living people
Central Michigan University alumni
Recipients of the Defense Superior Service Medal
Recipients of the Distinguished Service Medal (US Army)
Recipients of the Legion of Merit
The Citadel, The Military College of South Carolina alumni
United States Army generals
United States Army personnel of the Iraq War